The 2020 Euro Beach Soccer League (EBSL) was the 23rd edition of the Euro Beach Soccer League, the annual, premier competition in European beach soccer contested between men's national teams. It is organised by Beach Soccer Worldwide (BSWW).

The season was greatly affected by the COVID-19 pandemic, resulting a campaign completely unrecognisable to that of recent seasons. Originally due to start in June, the start of the season was postponed until September which ultimately saw the entire regular season cancelled. Therefore, all competing teams were entered straight into their respective divisions' post-season events: nations of Division A into the Superfinal, to compete to become the winners of this year's EBSL, and countries of Division B into the Promotion Final, to try to earn a spot in Division A next year. However, due to travel restrictions caused by the pandemic, many nations chose not to participate, and ultimately no competition concerning Division B took place at all.

Portugal were the defending champions and successfully retained their title, earning their seventh European crown.

Effects of the COVID-19 Pandemic

Initial consequences
The preliminary 2020 EBSL season schedule was released in November 2019. It was planned that the regular season, taking place during June and July, would consist of five stages of fixtures in Moscow (Russia), Naples (Italy), Nazaré (Portugal), Budapest (Hungary) and one unnamed location.

In March 2020, with the severity of the COVID-19 pandemic increasing rapidly across Europe, Beach Soccer Worldwide (BSWW) announced the suspension of all beach soccer competitions under their auspices until at least June to protect the health of all those involved. In May, with the situation yet to improve, BSWW extended the suspension until September – typically this is the end of the EBSL season. However, in July, with the situation in Europe easing, BSWW announced that the EBSL season would begin in August but with major format changes due to the virus's effect:

Due to the extreme delay to the start of the season, the entire regular season was cancelled. 
Only the finals (Superfinal and Promotion Final) were to go ahead; all teams were entered straight into the post-season events (usually only the top eight teams from each division at the end of the regular season enter).
The usual format of the post-season events was abandoned to accommodate the different number of participating teams.
There was no relegation from Division A (in part, this was a provision for nations in Division A choosing not to participate out of health and safety concerns surrounding the ongoing pandemic – they were not penalised for making this choice).

Calendar and locations 
The original calendar was revealed on 8 July 2020.

Chișinău, Moldova was to host the Promotion Final from 19 to 23 August, whilst Figueira da Foz, Portugal was to host the Superfinal from 1–6 September. Organisers, BSWW, stressed the schedule may be changed depending on the future state of the COVID-19 pandemic; changes were subsequently made:

The local organisers in Figueira da Foz decided to defer hosting until 2021 due to the requirement of having to play their event behind closed doors this year. Later, due to cross-border travel restrictions because of the pandemic, BSWW and the Moldovan Football Federation (FMF) agreed to postpone Chișinău's hosting until 2021 as well. 

The Superfinal was rescheduled to take place as follows, however the Promotion Final was never rescheduled and thus no competition regarding Division B took place this season:

Teams
The numbers in parentheses show the European ranking of each team prior to the start of the season, out of 37 nations.

Division A
With COVID-19 concerns and restrictions in mind, of the 12 sides in the top tier, just five decided to participate as follows. This made it the first season of the competition not to feature Italy or Spain.

  (1st)
  (2nd)
  (3rd)
  (4th)
  (5th)
  (6th)

  (7th)
  (8th)
  (9th)
  (10th)
  (11th)
  (13th)

Division B
None – season cancelled.

Superfinal
Matches are listed as local time in Nazaré, WEST (UTC+1)

All matches took place at the Estádio do Viveiro on Praia de Nazaré (Nazaré Beach). Due to COVID-19 concerns, the matches were played behind closed doors.

The Superfinal was played in a single round-robin format, involving one group of all five teams. The team with the most points after all games were completed were crowned EBSL champions.

As per the effects of the COVID-19 Pandemic on the competition, no team was relegated to Division B this season.

Results

Key: (H) Hosts

Awards

Winners trophy

Individual awards

Top scorers
Players with at least 2 goals

8 goals

 Dejan Stankovic

7 goals

 Leo Martins

5 goals

 Glenn Hodel
 Valon Beqiri

4 goals

 Noël Ott
 Josh Meltzer
 Andrii Pashko

3 goals

 Angelo Wuest
 André Lourenço
 Belchior
 Maksym Voitok
 Quentin Gosselin
 Christian Biermann

2 goals

 Eliott Mounoud
 Bruno Torres
 Bê Martins
 Dmytro Voitenko
 Sébastien Huck
 Stephane Belhomme
 Oleg Zborovskyi
 Julin Mutulingam

Source

References

External links
Euro Beach Soccer League Superfinal Nazaré 2020 , at Beach Soccer Worldwide
Euroleague 2020, at Beach Soccer Russia (in Russian and English)
EBSL Nazaré (Superfinal) 2020, at ZeroZero.pt (in Portuguese)

Euro Beach Soccer League
Euro Beach Soccer League
Euro Beach Soccer League
Euro Beach Soccer League
Euro Beach Soccer